Narra may refer to:
 Timber trees in the genus Pterocarpus, also known as padauk
 Pterocarpus indicus, a common species referred to as Narra
 Narra, Palawan, a municipality in the Philippines
 Narra, Bokaro, a census town in Jharkhand, India
 Narra Raghava Reddy (1924–2015), leader of the Communist Party of India
 Narra Venkateswara Rao (died 2009), Telugu film actor
 Ravi Kumar Narra (b. 1963), Indian businessman and social worker
 Commander Narra, a fictional character from the Star Wars expanded universe; see List of minor Star Wars characters

The acronym NARRA may refer to:
 North American Road Racing Association

See also
 Nara (disambiguation)
 Narro (disambiguation)